Metrarabdotosidae is a family of bryozoans belonging to the order Cheilostomatida.

Genera:
 Aequilumina Gontar, 2002
 Biavicularium Cheetham, 1968
 Metrarabdotos Canu, 1914
 Polirhabdotos Hayward & Thorpe, 1987

References

Cheilostomatida